The 2008–09 season was the 67th and final season of competitive association football in the Football League played by Chester City, an English club based in Chester, Cheshire.

Also, it was the fifth season spent in the Football League Two, after the promotion from the Football Conference in 2004. Alongside competing in the Football League the club also participated in the FA Cup, the Football League Cup and the Football League Trophy.

Season summary
In 2007–08, Chester finished the season in 22nd place, only one spot above the relegation zone, on just 47 points from the 46 matches. Chester began the 2008–09 season with a squad of only 22 players and a transfer embargo, including youth team players given professional contracts just prior to the season. However, at the start of the campaign it seemed unlikely for City to get relegated, as Rotherham United and A.F.C. Bournemouth had both been deducted 17 points for rules violations before the start of the season, and Luton Town faced a 30-point penalty. A poor start to 2008–09 saw Davies sacked in November 2008 with the club out of all cup competitions and struggling in League Two. Mark Wright returned for his third spell as manager on a non-contract basis. Beset by an ongoing transfer embargo, Chester continued to struggle throughout the remainder of the campaign, and a 2–1 home defeat by Darlington on the final day of the season sealed Chester's demise and a return to non-league football after five years back in The Football League. Two weeks after the final match the club entered administration.

Football League

Results summary

Results by matchday

Matches

FA Cup

Football League Cup

Football League Trophy

Season statistics

References

External links

2008–09
Chester City F.C.